Fallen Angels is a 1984 punk album by the band Fallen Angels, a project of Knox of The Vibrators and members of Hanoi Rocks; Nasty Suicide, Sam Yaffa, Razzle, Mike Monroe, Andy McCoy. At the time Knox and the Hanoi Rocks shared the same manager.

Issues 
The original LP was issued in UK (Fall LP 23), Sweden (Sword SWA 001), Canada (Quality SV-2133) and Japan (SMS Sounds Marketing System SP25-5120) in 1984. The record was re-released on CD in 1990 in Japan (Mercury PHCR-1011), the US (Deadline CLP 0501-2), Sweden (Raw Power RP-005). The CD was reissued by Fallout in the UK in 2006.

Track listing 
All tracks composed by Ian M. Carnochan
"Inner Planet Love"
"Precious Heart"
"Partners in Crime"
"Housten Tower"
"Amphetamine Blue"
"He's a Rebel"
"Black & White World"
"Rain, Rain, Rain"
"Falling"
"Runaround"
"Cuckoo Land"
"Kiss It Goodbye"
"New Society"
"Straight City"
"Vipers in the Dark"

Personnel 
Fallen Angels
Knox – lead vocals, lead guitar, keyboards, cover painting
Nasty Suicide – rhythm guitar
Sam Yaffa – bass guitar, backing vocals
Razzle – drums, backing vocals
with:
Richard Wernham – additional keyboards, percussion
The Cosmic Ted – additional guitar
The Flashing Psychedelic Kid – saxophone
Greg Von Cook – arrangement on "Vipers in the Dark"

References 

1984 debut albums